Josef Buchner (born 16 May 1974) is a German former skier. He competed in the Nordic combined event at the 1998 Winter Olympics.

References

External links
 

1974 births
Living people
German male Nordic combined skiers
Olympic Nordic combined skiers of Germany
Nordic combined skiers at the 1998 Winter Olympics
People from Traunstein
Sportspeople from Upper Bavaria